Hinz is a surname. Notable people with the surname include:

Arthur F. Hinz (1886–1969), American politician
Christopher Hinz (born 1951), American writer
Dietmar Hinz (born 1953), German wrestler
Dinah Hinz (1934–2020), German actress
Emil A. Hinz (1889–1964), American politician
Gertrud Hinz (1912–1996), German film editor
Hans-Martin Hinz (born 1947), German museum administrator
Hermann Hinz (1916–2000), German archaeologist
Johann-Peter Hinz (1941–2007), German sculptor
Michael Hinz (1939–2008), German actor
Michael Hinz (footballer) (born 1987), German footballer
Petra Hinz (born 1962), German politician
Tyson Hinz (born 1991), Canadian basketball player
Vanessa Hinz (born 1992), German biathlete
Volker Hinz (1947–2019), German photographer
Werner Hinz (1903–1985), German actor

See also